Carlos Castro Sedano (born 7 January 1949) is a Mexican sprinter. He competed in the men's 4 × 400 metres relay at the 1968 Summer Olympics.

References

1949 births
Living people
Athletes (track and field) at the 1968 Summer Olympics
Mexican male sprinters
Olympic athletes of Mexico
Place of birth missing (living people)
20th-century Mexican people